The 1958–59 Polska Liga Hokejowa season was the 24th season of the Polska Liga Hokejowa, the top level of ice hockey in Poland. Eight teams participated in the league, and Legia Warszawa won the championship.

Regular season

Final
 Legia Warszawa - Górnik Katowice 5:0

External links
 Season on hockeyarchives.info

Polska
Polska Hokej Liga seasons
1958–59 in Polish ice hockey